Sarah Langan (born 1974) is an American horror author and three-time Bram Stoker Award winner. Langan was also one of the judges for the inaugural Shirley Jackson Award  and is currently on the Board of Directors.

Biography
Langan was raised in Long Island, New York and graduated from Garden City High School in 1992. She attended Colby College in Waterville, Maine and earned her Master of Fine Arts from Columbia University in 2000. She resides in Brooklyn, New York with her husband, author and filmmaker J. T. Petty.

Bibliography
Langan published her first story, "Sick People", while attending college in Maine. Her short story "The Lost" won the Bram Stoker Award in 2008.

She has published four novels:

The Keeper - 2006 
The Missing - 2007 (2007 Bram Stoker Award winner)
Audrey's Door - 2009 (2009 Bram Stoker Award winner)
Good Neighbors - 2021 

Langan's short stories have been published in Cemetery Dance, Phantom, Chiaroscuro, Brave New Worlds, Darkness on the Edge, and Unspeakable Horror.

References

External links

American horror writers
Columbia University School of the Arts alumni
Living people
Writers from New York (state)
Colby College alumni
American women writers
People from Long Island
Women horror writers
1974 births
Garden City High School (New York) alumni
21st-century American women